Mikko Nuutinen (born 6 October 1990) is a Finnish former professional ice hockey player.

Career
He had played for KalPa of the SM-liiga. He previously played for the SaPKo in the Mestis. He signed a contract extension with KalPa in 2017.

Career statistics

Regular season and playoffs

Awards and honors

References

External links

1990 births
Living people
KalPa players
SaPKo players
HKM Zvolen players
HK Dukla Michalovce players
Finnish ice hockey forwards
People from Kuopio
Sportspeople from North Savo
Finnish expatriate ice hockey players in Slovakia